Royal Roy: A Prince of a Boy was a 1985-1986 bimonthly comic book from Marvel Comics' younger-readers' imprint Star Comics. It was created by Lennie Herman and Warren Kremer.

Publication history
Royal Roy began in April 1985 as an answer to the successful Harvey Comics Richie Rich series. Its title character was the young Prince Roy of Cashelot, a fictional kingdom whose name was a portmanteau of "cash" and "Camelot". Like Richie, Roy was surrounded by wealth and luxury but wasn't spoiled by it; in many ways, he was just like any other young boy. Also like Richie, Roy had a sweet-natured middle-class girlfriend (Crystal Cleer) and a wealthy, abrasive acquaintance (Lorna Loot) who vied for his affections.

In late 1985, Harvey Comics sued Marvel for copyright infringement, claiming that Royal Roy was a blatant copy of Richie Rich. Longtime Harvey creator Lennie Herman had created Royal Roy for Star Comics; Herman died in 1983 before the first issue of Royal Roy was published. Artist Warren Kremer, the co-creator, was also the co-creator of Richie Rich.

Royal Roy was cancelled after six issues in March 1986 and Harvey's lawsuit was dropped.

X-Babies
An updated version of Royal Roy (along with Planet Terry, Top Dog, and Wally the Wizard) is featured in the four-issue X-Babies miniseries published by Marvel Comics in late 2009.

References

External links
 Royal Roy at Don Markstein's Toonopedia. Archived from the original on February 9, 2017.

Star Comics titles
1985 comics debuts
1986 comics endings
Fictional businesspeople
Child characters in comics
Male characters in comics
Humor comics
Fictional princes
Comics characters introduced in 1985
Comics involved in plagiarism controversies